Bavarian A V engines were 2-2-2 steam locomotives in service with the Royal Bavarian State Railways (Königlich Bayerische Staatsbahn). They were the last of the single-coupled locomotives built in Bavaria.

This class was the first express train locomotive with the Bavarian state railways. It was developed from the Class A IV. Unlike the A IV, the Class A V had a lower-pitched boiler and a wider firebox. In addition access to the valve gear was improved. Later still the vehicles were fitted with a steam dome. Because engines on the southern side of the Danube were fired with peat, they had a pear-shaped chimney. In addition these locomotives had different dimensions.

They were equipped with a 3 T 4.8 tender.

See also
 List of Bavarian locomotives and railbuses

References

Weblinks

Literature 
 Günther Scheingraber: Die Königlich Bayerischen Staatsbahnen. Ihre Lokomotiven und Wagen in Wort und Bild. Franckh'sche Verlagshandlung Stuttgart 1975. , pages 8 and 51.

2-2-2 locomotives
A V
Standard gauge locomotives of Germany
Railway locomotives introduced in 1853
Maffei locomotives
1A1 n2 locomotives
Passenger locomotives